David Boxley (17 June 1890 – 1941) was an English footballer who played in the Football League for Stoke.

Career
Boxley was born in Cradley Heath and played for Cradley Heath St Luke's before joining Stoke in 1919. He played a few times for Stoke during World War I and then eight matches in the Football League in 1919–20 where he scored four goals. He later played for Dudley Town.

Career statistics

References

1890 births
1941 deaths
People from Cradley Heath
English footballers
Association football forwards
Cradley Heath F.C. players
Stoke City F.C. players
Dudley Town F.C. players
English Football League players